Mariusz Rutkowski (born 5 September 1963) is a Polish sprint canoer who competed in the late 1980s and early 1990s. He won two medals in the K-4 10000 m event at the ICF Canoe Sprint World Championships with a silver in 1990 and a bronze in 1989.

References

Living people
Polish male canoeists
Place of birth missing (living people)
ICF Canoe Sprint World Championships medalists in kayak
1963 births